John Ross was a printer and publisher in 19th century Newcastle. His business was in the Royal Arcade, Newcastle.

He published several music chapbooks including The Songs of the Tyne, the first collection of that name, and consisting of 10 small volumes.

See also 
Geordie dialect words

References

Music in Newcastle upon Tyne
Northumbrian folklore
Geordie songwriters
Year of birth missing
Year of death missing